Gerard O’Donovan (born 16 April 1958 in Ireland) is the  founder and CEO of  Noble Manhattan Coaching, he is also recognised as having written a number of books on coaching.

Gerard has appeared many times on BBC, Fox News,  Romanian Television, The Irish Times Telegraph, etc.

Early life 
Born in Bantry County, Cork, Ireland, O'Donovan attended Bantry Primary School and Bantry Secondary School. At the age of 17, he joined the Royal Marines, and spent nine years in the Royal Marines Commandos. Later, while serving in the Royal Marines, he participated at The Open University.

Career 
After studying Psychology and Business, in 1993, O'Donovan founded Noble Manhattan Personal Development, which later became Noble Manhattan Coaching, now a major part of the Noble Manhattan group.

O'Donovan is best known for his coaching models and theories such as leadership development theory and leadership growth model.

As a professional coach he is recognized by several groups such as the Prince’s Trust (a Youth Charity set up by Prince Charles) as an excellent consultant and trainer of young people in the business world. 

He has been the non-executive Director and past president of the International Authority for Professional Coaching and Mentoring, IAPC&M - International Authority for Professional Coaching & Mentoring and a founding director of the  International Regulator for Coaching and Mentoring.

Personal life 
He currently lives with his family in Weymouth, Dorset, in southern England.

Gerard O'Donovan is married and has three children.

Books 
O'Donovan is the author of the books:

 The 30 Minute Life Coach (2000)

 A Coaches Story (2011)
 Voices of Experience, together with Jacqui Harper (2005)
 Good Questions!, co-authored with Judy Barber (2005)
 Jacqui Harper, Voices of Experience (2005)
David Miskimin and Jack Stewart, The Coaching Parent, foreword written by Gerard O'Donovan (2006)

References 

1958 births
Living people
People from County Cork
Irish male writers